Li Xiyin (20 May 1926 – 5 September 2022) was a Chinese lexicographer and politician. He served in the National People's Congress from 1988 to 1998.

Li died in Wanning on 5 September 2022, at the age of 96.

References

1926 births
2022 deaths
20th-century Chinese politicians
Members of the National People's Congress
Delegates to the 7th National People's Congress
Delegates to the 8th National People's Congress
Chinese lexicographers
Yenching University alumni
Heilongjiang University alumni
Politicians from Zhejiang